At least two ships of the Argentine Navy have been named Granville:

 , a  commissioned in 1937 and decommissioned in 1967.
 , a  launched in 1980.

Argentine Navy ship names